In enzymology, a formate—tetrahydrofolate ligase is an enzyme that catalyzes the chemical reaction

ATP + formate + tetrahydrofolate  ADP + phosphate + 10-formyltetrahydrofolate

The 3 substrates of this enzyme are ATP, formate, and tetrahydrofolate, whereas its 3 products are ADP, phosphate, and 10-formyltetrahydrofolate.

This enzyme belongs to the family of ligases, specifically those forming generic carbon-nitrogen bonds.  This enzyme participates in glyoxylate and dicarboxylate metabolism and one carbon pool by folate.

In eukaryotes the FTHFS activity is expressed by a multifunctional enzyme, C-1-tetrahydrofolate synthase (C1-THF synthase), which also catalyses the dehydrogenase and cyclohydrolase activities. Two forms of C1-THF synthases are known, one is located in the mitochondrial matrix, while the second one is cytoplasmic. In both forms the FTHFS domain consists of about 600 amino acid residues and is located in the C-terminal section of C1-THF synthase. In prokaryotes FTHFS activity is expressed by a monofunctional homotetrameric enzyme of about 560 amino acid residues.

Nomenclature 
The systematic name of this enzyme class is formate:tetrahydrofolate ligase (ADP-forming). Other names in common use include:
 formyltetrahydrofolate synthetase, 
 10-formyltetrahydrofolate synthetase, 
 tetrahydrofolic formylase, and 
 tetrahydrofolate formylase.

Examples 

Human genes encoding formate-tetrahydrofolate ligases include:
 MTHFD1 – cytoplasmic
 MTHFD1L – mitochondrial

Structural studies

The crystal structure of N(10)-formyltetrahydrofolate synthetase from Moorella thermoacetica shows that the subunit is composed of three domains organised around three mixed beta-sheets. There are two cavities between adjacent domains. One of them was identified as the nucleotide binding site by homology modelling. The large domain contains a seven-stranded beta-sheet surrounded by helices on both sides. The second domain contains a five-stranded beta-sheet with two alpha-helices packed on one side while the other two are a wall of the active site cavity. The third domain contains a four-stranded beta-sheet forming a half-barrel. The concave side is covered by two helices while the convex side is another wall of the large cavity. Arg 97 is likely involved in formyl phosphate binding. The tetrameric molecule is relatively flat with the shape of the letter X, and the active sites are located at the end of the subunits far from the subunit interface.

Related enzymes

The reverse reaction converting 10-formyltetrahydrofolate to tetrahydrofolate is performed by formyltetrahydrofolate dehydrogenase.

References

Further reading
 
 
 
 

Protein families
EC 6.3.4
Enzymes of known structure